Alkiviadis is a given name.

People with the name include:

 Alkiviadis Stefanis, army officer and minister in the Greek government
 Alkiviadis Papageorgopoulos, Greek sportshooter and Olympian
 Alkiviadis Christofi, Cypriot footballer
 Alkiviadis Diamanti di Samarina, Greek political figure and Axis collaborator

See also
 Alcibiades (disambiguation)

Masculine given names